This article contains opinion polling by U.S. state for the 2012 Republican Party presidential primaries.

As of May 2012, both Ron Paul and Mitt Romney have led polls in multiple states. They have both also reached at least 20 percent in polls in multiple states. Before announcing that they would not run, Mike Huckabee and Sarah Palin were also leading polls in multiple states with numbers above 20 percent. Michele Bachmann, Herman Cain, Rick Perry, and Rick Santorum were also able to lead polls in multiple states earlier in the race, but Cain suspended his campaign on December 3 after multiple allegations of sexual impropriety, Bachmann dropped out on January 4, one day after her poor showing in the Iowa caucuses, in which she came in sixth place and received just 5 percent of the vote, Perry dropped out on January 19 after finishing fifth in Iowa with just over 10 percent of the vote, finishing sixth in New Hampshire with less than 1 percent of the vote and with "lagging" poll numbers ahead of the South Carolina primary, and Santorum suspended his campaign on April 10. Newt Gingrich announced he would drop out of the race after a poor showing in the northeast on April 24.

Haley Barbour of Mississippi, Jeb Bush of Florida, Chris Christie of New Jersey, Jim DeMint of South Carolina, Bobby Jindal of Louisiana, Tim Pawlenty of Minnesota, Paul Ryan of Wisconsin and John Thune of South Dakota all succeeded in leading polls in their home states at some point in 2011, although only Pawlenty actually launched a campaign. Pawlenty exited the race on August 14, one day after finishing third in Iowa's Ames Straw Poll, citing a lack of campaign funds.

Polling for completed primaries

Washington (March 3)

Winner  Mitt Romney
Caucus date March 3, 2012
Delegates 43

Alaska (March 6)

Winner  Mitt Romney
Caucus date March 6, 2012
Delegates 27

Georgia (March 6)

Winner  Newt Gingrich
Primary date March 6, 2012
Delegates 76

Massachusetts (March 6)

Winner  Mitt Romney
Primary date March 6, 2012
Delegates 41

Ohio (March 6)

Winner  Mitt Romney
Primary date March 6, 2012
Delegates 66

Oklahoma (March 6)

Winner  Rick Santorum
Primary date March 6, 2012
Delegates 43

Tennessee (March 6)

Winner  Rick Santorum
Primary date March 6, 2012
Delegates 58

Vermont (March 6)

Winner  Mitt Romney
Primary date March 6, 2012
Delegates 17

Virginia (March 6)

Winner  Mitt Romney
Primary date March 6, 2012
Delegates 50
Note Only Mitt Romney and Ron Paul appeared on the ballot. Other candidates failed to submit the necessary 10,000 signatures.

Alabama (March 13)

Winner  Rick Santorum
Primary date March 13, 2012
Delegates 50

Hawaii (March 13)

Winner  Mitt Romney
Caucus date March 13, 2012
Delegates 20

Mississippi (March 13)

Winner  Rick Santorum
Primary date March 13, 2012
Delegates 40

Illinois (March 20)

Winner  Mitt Romney
Primary date March 20, 2012
Delegates 69

Missouri (March 15–24)

Caucus date March 17, 2012
Delegates 52

Louisiana (March 24)

Winner  Rick Santorum
Primary date March 24, 2012
Delegates 46

See also
Results of the 2012 Republican Party presidential primaries
Straw polls for the Republican Party presidential primaries, 2012
Nationwide opinion polling for the Republican Party 2012 presidential primaries

References

Opinion polling for the 2012 United States presidential election